Calendula tripterocarpa is a species of flowering plant in the marigold genus Calendula, family Asteraceae. It is native to Spain, the Canary Islands, North Africa, and the Middle East as far as Iran. It is a therophyte.

References

tripterocarpa
Flora of Spain
Flora of the Canary Islands
Flora of North Africa
Flora of Sinai
Flora of Palestine (region)
Flora of Lebanon
Flora of Syria
Flora of Iraq
Flora of Iran
Flora of Saudi Arabia
Flora of the Gulf States
Plants described in 1856